Anthony or Tony Martin may refer to:

Education 
 Tony Martin (professor) (1942–2013), professor at Wellesley College known for racial controversies in the early 1990s
 Donald A. Martin (born 1940), aka Tony Martin, set theorist at UCLA

Film and television 
 Tony Martin (American singer) (1913–2012), American actor and singer
 Tony Martin (comedian) (born 1964), New Zealand-Australian comedian and actor
 Tony Martin (Australian actor) (born 1953), Australian actor
 Anthony Martin (escape artist) (born 1966), escape artist
 Tony Martin, fictional character from the British situation comedy dinnerladies
 Anthony Martin, fictional character in the Just William stories

Music 
 Tony Martin (songwriter), country music songwriter
 Tony Martin (British singer) (born 1957), English musician, best known for his work with Black Sabbath
 Lutan Fyah (Anthony Martin, born 1975), Jamaican reggae artist

Sports 
 Tony Martin (cyclist) (born 1985), German cyclist
 Tony Martin (rugby league) (born 1978), Australian rugby league footballer
 Tony Martin (American football) (born 1965), retired National Football League receiver
 Tony Martin (darts player) (born 1981), English darts player
 Tony Martin (racing driver), South African sports car driver
 Tony Martin (rower) (1947–2005), American Olympic rower
 Tony Martin (fighter) (born 1989), mixed-martial artist
 Anthony Martin (basketball) (born 1980), British professional basketball player
 Anthony Martin (cricketer) (born 1982), West Indian cricketer
 Anthony Martin (footballer) (born 1989), French footballer
 Anthony Martin (water polo) (born 1985), Australian water polo player
 Anthony Martin (weightlifter) (born 1979), Australian weightlifter
 Anthony Martin (racing driver) (born 1995), Australian racing driver

Others 
 Tony Martin (politician) (born 1948), Canadian politician
 Tony Martin (artist) (born 1937), creator of liquid light shows
 Tony Martin (farmer) (born 1944), English farmer who was imprisoned for fatally shooting a burglar
 Anthony J. Martin, American paleontologist
 Anthony Martin (bishop) (died 1650), Anglican priest in Ireland

See also 
 Tony Martyn (born 1957), footballer